Sierra Cedars is an unincorporated community in Fresno County, California. It lies at an elevation of 5794 feet (1766 m).

References

Unincorporated communities in California
Unincorporated communities in Fresno County, California